Paul Smith (born 29 October 1955) is a British former racing driver.

He competed in the 1980 British Formula One Championship.

Racing record

Complete British Saloon Car Championship results
(key) (Races in bold indicate pole position; races in italics indicate fastest lap.)

References

1955 births
Living people
British racing drivers
British Formula One drivers
British Formula One Championship drivers
European Formula Two Championship drivers
World Sportscar Championship drivers
24 Hours of Le Mans drivers
IMSA GT Championship drivers